This is a list of notable Tumbuka people, a Bantu people of Southern Africa.

Sports 

 Mwayi Kumwenda (Malawian best female international netball player)
 Bridget Kumwenda (female netball player)
 Chiukepo Msowoya (Malawian footballer)
 Robert Ng'ambi (former Malawian footballer)
 Tamika Mkandawire (former professional footballer)
 Loreen Ngwira (netball player)
 Towera Vinkhumbo (netball player)

Politicians 

 Chakufwa Chihana (human rights activist, pro-democracy advocate, trade unionist and  politician)
 Rose Chibambo (Malawian prominent female politician)

 Dindi Gowa Nyasulu ( engineer, politician and former head of AFORD)
 Rodwell Munyenyembe (politician and former Speaker of the National Assembly)

Religious leaders 

 Sheperd Bushiri (prophet and businessman)

Ministers 

 Goodall Gondwe (economist and former Minister of Finance of Malawi)
 Agnes Nyalonje (Minister of Education of Malawi)

Tumbuka people
Lists of Malawian people
Lists of people by ethnicity